The California Department of Corrections and Rehabilitation (CDCR) runs 44 conservation camps (also called fire camps) jointly with the California Department of Forestry and Fire Protection (CAL FIRE) and the Los Angeles County Fire Department. The mission of the Conservation Camp program is to "support state, local and federal government agencies as they respond to emergencies such as fires, floods, and other natural or manmade disasters." Over 3,000 incarcerated people work at the conservation camps each year, including men, women, and juveniles, all of whom have volunteered for the program. All volunteers receive the same entry-level training as CAL FIRE's seasonal firefighters.

CAL FIRE reported 3,500 incarcerated firefighters in its 2018-2019 staffing numbers, making incarcerated firefighters approximately 27% of the total firefighting capacity of the state.

History 

Conservation camps are an evolution of "road camps" staffed by incarcerated people, first formally authorized by the California state legislature in 1915 to build roads and railroads, respond to environmental issues, and participate in some types of agriculture. In response to firefighter labor shortages during World War II, the Rainbow Conservation Camp was established as the first permanent fire camp, in 1946. It was modeled after New Deal Civilian Conservation Corps camps.

The program grew to 16 camps throughout California in the 40s and 50s, including the first youth camps. In 1959, California Senate Bill 516 authorized expansion of the program, motivated by the comparatively cheap cost of housing and paying incarcerated laborer for firefighting and environmental programs, the belief that the program was effective at rehabilitation, and a desire to reduce overcrowding inside prisons. Between 1959 and 1966, the program grew to 42 camps staffed by 2,880 incarcerated people, or 8.7% of the prison population at that time.

Camp funding and therefore staffing declined under the Governorship of Ronald Reagan from 1967 to 1975, before a resurgence in the 1980s emphasizing cost savings rather than rehabilitation. The first conservation camp for women was opened in 1983 with the conversion of the Rainbow Conservation Camp from a men's camp to a women's camp. Per a 1990 pamphlet published by the CDCR, "As they repay their debt to society, camp inmates also provide a real economic benefit to local communities. In 1989 alone, camp inmates worked 5.5 million hours—a $43 million value".

Per a CDCR news report, as of 2007 "Approximately 200 crews log an average of more than three million person hours a year fighting wildfires and responding to floods, earthquakes, and search and rescue missions. [...] When not responding to emergencies, crews put in an additional seven million hours every year working on conservation projects on public lands and community service projects. Fire crews clean up campgrounds, beaches and parks on city, county and state land and provide the labor for weed abatement and other projects that help reduce the risk of fires and other disasters." The report also stated that use of incarcerated labor in Conservation Camps save the state more than $80 million annually.

Staffing 

Today, approximately 3,100 incarcerated people live and work out of 44 camps run by the California Department of Corrections and Rehabilitation in conjunction with either CAL FIRE or the Los Angeles County Fire Department. Camps are structured as open dormitories, with dining and maintenance activities staffed by incarcerated people and supervised by correctional staff. The two active camps for women are Malibu Conservation Camp and Puerta la Cruz. Most youth camps have been converted to camps for adult men, with one remaining youth camp at Pine Grove.

Work varies by camp but often includes:

 Fire prevention (fuel reduction)
 Fire suppression
 Cemetery maintenance
 Conservation projects
 Fence building
 Flood control
 Manufacturing of signs and plaques
 Museum construction and maintenance
 Production and maintenance of firefighter gear
 School grounds maintenance
 Search and rescue
 Trail maintenance
 Vegetation removal
 Lumber processing and woodworking

Programs vary by camp but often include:

 Alcoholics Anonymous and Narcotics Anonymous
 GED and college correspondence courses
 Faith-based services
 Hobby crafts
 Visitation

Mobile Fire Kitchen Units, deployed to feed responders and displaced community members in emergencies like fires and earthquakes, are primarily staffed by incarcerated workers from conservation camps.

Conservation camps in the news 

Conservation camps received increased public scrutiny in the late 2000s after a series of damaging fires in the state, with concerns about the safety of incarcerated firefighters, their compensation, and their inability to become firefighters upon release. Two incarcerated firefighters at Bautista Conservation Camp died in a 1990 fire, and many crew members were injured. Three incarcerated firefighters died on the job in 2017 and 2018. In response to one media inquiry about conditions and pay, a CDCR spokesperson stated that firefighters earn $2.90 - $5.12 per day, with an additional $1 per hour when assigned to an active emergency.

Citing a San Francisco Chronicle article about a bill to remove restrictions on formerly incarcerated firefighters becoming career firefighters upon release, 2020 presidential candidate Julian Castro tweeted "In California, incarcerated people are risking their lives battling wildfires for $1/hour. Yet these same people are barred from firefighting after release. It's wrong. If you can save lives serving a sentence, you can save lives when you're released." The bill did not pass.

In September 2020, Governor Gavin Newsom signed Assembly Bill 2147, which allows inmate firefighters to petition courts to dismiss their convictions after completing their sentences. This would provide a path for former prisoners to obtain EMT certification on release, a frequent requirement for hiring or advancement as a firefighter.

See also
 Prisons in California
 Incarceration in California
 Penal labor in the United States

References 

Firefighting in California
Penal system in California
Penal labor in the United States